Henry Degen House is a historic home located at Washington, Franklin County, Missouri. It was built in about 1873, and is a -story, five bay, double entrance brick dwelling on a stone foundation.  It has a side-gable roof and segmental arched door and window openings.  It features an ornate front porch across the center bay.
It was listed on the National Register of Historic Places in 2000.

References

Houses on the National Register of Historic Places in Missouri
Houses completed in 1873
Buildings and structures in Franklin County, Missouri
National Register of Historic Places in Franklin County, Missouri